Ron Dean (12 January 1916 – 23 April 1998) was an Australian rules footballer who played with Collingwood in the Victorian Football League (VFL).

Notes

External links 

Profile on Collingwood Forever

1916 births
1998 deaths
Australian rules footballers from Victoria (Australia)
Collingwood Football Club players
Brighton Football Club players